Lambda Tauri (λ Tau, λ Tauri) is a triple star system in the constellation Taurus. In the Calendarium of Al Achsasi Al Mouakket, this star was designated Sadr al Tauri, which was translated into Latin as Pectus Tauri, meaning "the bull chest". In 1848, the light from this system was found to vary periodically and it was determined to be an eclipsing binary system—the third such discovered. The components of this system have a combined apparent visual magnitude of +3.37 at its brightest, making it one of the brighter members of the constellation.

System 

The inner pair of this triple star system, Lambda Tauri AB, orbit around each other with a period of 3.95 days and a low eccentricity of about 0.025. Their orbital plane is inclined by around 76° to the line of sight from the Earth, so it is being viewed from nearly edge on and the two stars form an Algol-like eclipsing binary system. The combined brightness of the pair varies from magnitude +3.37 to +3.91 as first one star and then the other pass in front of its companion.

The primary component has a stellar classification of B3 V, making this a massive B-type main sequence star. It has over seven times the mass of the Sun and 6.4 times the Sun's radius. It, along with δ Librae, were the first stars on which rotational line broadening was observed, by Frank Schlesinger in 1909.

The third component, λ Tau C, is orbiting the inner pair over a 33.025 day period with an eccentricity of roughly 0.15. The orbital plane of this component is nearly coplanar with the orbit of Lambda Tauri AB, differing by no more than 7°. It has about half the mass of the Sun. The orbit of this star causes perturbation effects on the orbit of the AB pair, resulting in periodic changes in their orbital eccentricity and other orbital elements.

Physical characteristics 

The spectrum of Lambda Tauri A shows an under abundance of carbon relative to the norm for this category of star. A possible explanation for this is a loss of mass by the star some time in the past. An inner region of the star became depleted by the conversion of carbon into nitrogen during the nuclear fusion process, and this region was later exposed when the outer envelope of the star was lost. Alternatively, the star may have undergone a period of convective mixing, bringing the carbon-depleted material to the surface. However, the cause of such a fully convective behavior in a main sequence star of this mass is unclear.

The secondary companion has a stellar classification of A4 IV, suggesting that it is a subgiant star that has nearly exhausted the supply of hydrogen at its core and is in the process of evolving into a giant star. The side of the secondary facing the more massive star is being heated by an additional , which produces a rotational effect that causes the strength of the secondary's spectral lines to vary over the course of its orbit.

A conundrum with this system is the large radius of the secondary star. In stellar evolutionary terms, the more massive primary should be the first to reach the subgiant stage. Hence the enlarged radius of the secondary must be caused by a means other than the star's age. This suggests that the pair Lambda Tauri AB form a semidetached binary with the secondary filling its Roche lobe, giving it a distorted shape.

References

Algol variables
Tauri, Lambda
B-type main-sequence stars
Taurus (constellation)
Triple star systems
A-type subgiants
Tauri, 035
018724
1239
025204
Durchmusterung objects